is a Japanese professional wrestler, currently working for the Japanese promotion World Wonder Ring Stardom where she a former Future of Stardom Champion.

Professional wrestling career

World Wonder Ring Stardom (2017-present)
Hanan made her professional wrestling debut at the early age of 13, on the fifth night of the Stardom Grows Up Stars 2017 event on April 9, where she fell short to Ruaka.

At Stardom Yokohama Dream Cinderella 2021 on April 4, Hanan teamed up with Stars stablemates Mayu Iwatani, Saya Iida, Starlight Kid & Gokigen Death in a losing effort against Oedo Tai (Natsuko Tora, Ruaka, Konami, Saki Kashima & Rina). On the first night of Stardom Cinderella Tournament 2021 from April 10, she fell short to Himeka in the tournament first-round matches, on the second night from May 14 she unsuccessfully competed against  Natsupoi, Lady C, and Tam Nakano in a four-way match, and on the final night from June 12, she teamed up with Stars stablemates Mayu Iwatani, Starlight Kid, Koguma & Rin Kadokura in a losing effort against Oedo Tai (Natsuko Tora, Konami, Fukigen Death, Ruaka & Saki Kashima). At Yokohama Dream Cinderella 2021 in Summer from July 4, Hanan teamed up with Rina to unsuccessfully compete in a gauntlet tag team match won by Konami & Fukigen Death and also involving Maika & Lady C, and Saki Kashima & Rina. Hanan competed in almost each of the seventeen nights of the Stardom 5 Star Grand Prix 2021, but without being part of the official tournament. She began with the first event from July 31 where she teamed up with Lady C and Queen's Quest (AZM & Hina) in a losing effort against Oedo Tai (Saki Kashima, Konami, Rina & Ruaka). On the finals of the tournament from September 25, she picked up a victory against Momo Watanabe and Rina in a three-way match. At the 2021 edition of the Goddesses of Stardom Tag League, Hanan teamed up with Rina as Water & Oil and competed in the "Red Goddess Block", scoring a total of two points after going against the teams of FWC (Hazuki & Koguma), Aphrodite (Utami Hayashishita & Saya Kamitani), Himepoi '21 (Himeka & Natsupoi), Cosmic Angels (Unagi Sayaka & Mai Sakurai), and I love HigashiSpo! (Saki Kashima & Fukigen Death). At Kawasaki Super Wars, the first event of the Stardom Super Wars trilogy which took place on November 3, 2021, Hanan & Rina fell short to Saki Kashima & Fukigen Death in one of the Goddesses of Stardom Tag League block matches. At Tokyo Super Wars on November 27, she teamed up with Mayu Iwatani & Hazuki to defeat Saki Kashima, Fukigen Death & Rina. At Stardom Dream Queendom on December 29, Hanan won the first title of her career, the Future of Stardom Championship, by defeating Ruaka.

At Stardom Nagoya Supreme Fight on January 29, 2022, Hanan successfully defended the Future of Stardom Championship for the first time against Lady C. She scored the second successful defense of the title at Stardom Cinderella Journey on February 23 where she defeated fellow stablemate Momo Kohgo. At Stardom New Blood 1 on March 11, 2022, Hanan teamed up with a returning Saya Iida to defeat JTO's Tomoka Inaba & Aoi. Furtherly, Hanan defended the future title successfully two times on both of Stardom World Climax 2022 nights, firstly against Rina on March 26, and secondly against Mai Sakurai on March 27.

Personal life
Hanan is the real-life older sister of fellow wrestlers Rina and Hina, who also compete in Stardom.

Championships and accomplishments
Pro Wrestling Illustrated
 Ranked No. 132 of the top 150 female wrestlers in the PWI Women's 150 in 2022
World Wonder Ring Stardom
Future of Stardom Championship (1 time)
Stardom Year-End Award (1 time)
Best Unit Award (2022)

References

External links

2004 births
Living people
Japanese female professional wrestlers
People from Shimotsuke, Tochigi
Sportspeople from Tochigi Prefecture
21st-century Japanese women
Future of Stardom Champions